The following are the winners of the 26th annual (1999) Origins Award, presented at Origins 2000:

External links
 1999 Origins Awards Winners

1999 awards
1999 awards in the United States
Origins Award winners